Seyed Abbas Moosavi Motlagh (born in Dorud on January 20, 1977) is an Iranian cleric, theologian, writer, religious lecturer, a teacher in university and seminary, political activist and one of the activists and observers of the Guardian Council of the Islamic Republic of Iran. He is a staunch supporter of the Islamic Republic of Iran.

Mousavi Motlagh was attacked by followers of Grand Ayatollah Sadiq al-Shirazi, for expressing strong views against him.

He is mostly known by his books and lectures in the most famous religious meetings.

Biography 
Seyed Abbas Mousavi Motlagh was born in a religious family, son of Seyyed Ghulam Moosavi Motlagh a member of Islamic Revolutionary Guard Corps. His mother is the daughter of Seyed Gholam Ali Mousavi Sistani. He went into Military service from the year 1374 to 1376.

References

External links

 وبگاه اندیشه وران
 وبگاه کمیلی
 وبگاه یادواره شهدا
 خبرگزاری عقیق
 باشگاه خبرنگاران جوان
 وبگاه هیئت تی وی
 خبرگزاری مهر
 خبرگزاری رسمی حوزه
 خبرگزاری بین المللی قرآن کریم
 وبگاه MP4
 خبرگزاری جهان نیوز
 خبرگزاری شبستان
 خبرگزاری دانشجو

Living people
Iranian Shia scholars of Islam
People from Dorud
1977 births